Maris Stella College is a Catholic College in Negombo, Sri Lanka, which was founded by the Marist Brothers in 1922.

History
In 1918 four Marist Brothers came to Negombo, Sri Lanka, and took over the management of St Mary's College. In 1922, the school moved to its present site and assumed the new name of Maris Stella College. The history of the Primary School goes back to 1921 when Bro. Lewis was in charge of the elementary school, Standard Two E.S.L.C (Elementary School Leaving Certificate) Class. There were three long cadjan sheds which housed eight primary classes.

The school's broadcasting services were inaugurated in 1930. Maris Stella installed a wireless set in the library, and the boys followed lessons, such as nature talks to children. Electricity came to the whole of Negombo in 1931. The same year the first Corpus Christi procession took place. It went around the quadrangle. The cadets presented a Royal Guard of Honour.

In August 1939, World War II broke out. The following year the school was requisitioned in part by the Royal Artillery for their headquarters. The Primary School shifted to Tammita Church grounds into temporary cadjan sheds. Then Royal Artillery moved out in November, but the Royal Air Force occupied the buildings in March the following year. The College was put under protection of Our Lady of Perpetual Help. There were frequent practices of Air Raid Precautions in schools. Trenches were dug for shelter, and every child knew what to do in case of an air raid warning. The school was in Easter holidays when the Japanese Air Raid took place in 1942 but their invasion fleet was turned back.

In the meantime, a three-quarter acre block of land behind Maris Stella was purchased and 12 classrooms, a staff room, and a principal's office were built; the primary school moved back from Tammita. When Bro. Nazier went to Europe in 1950, for a year's study leave, Mr. Leonard Obris acted as principal of the Primary Department. For many years the Primary Department was in temporary cadjan sheds. So a building project was launched. Funds were raised through carnivals and other means. Bro. Xavier was the architect and the builder of the primary school. In June 1959, Bro. Gerard Peiris became the next principal of Maris Stella Primary School.

Maris Stella Primary School had been going on for years as a separate third-grade aided school recognised by the Government with separate tutorial staff and annual returns. When all the third-grade schools were taken over by the Government. Maris Stella Primary School together with the primary schools of many leading Christian schools came under this category. This position was contested and the Government gave back the primary schools after some time, now to be recognised only as a section of the upper school under a principal and to be continued as a non-fee levying school.

It was during the time of Bro. Gerard Peiris as principal of the primary school where the change took place. After serving the College from 1959–65, he was transferred to Christ King College at Tudella, another Maris Institution. Bro. Joseph Fonseka, Bro. Ephrem Obris, Bro. Joseph Fonseka, Brother Shanthi Liyanage, Brother Dela Soysa, and Brother Remigius Fernando succeeded Bro. Gerard Peiris.

On 18 June 2022, Maris Stella College proudly celebrated its 100th anniversary with the presence of Malcolm Cardinal Ranjith.

Principals

Notable alumni

References

External links
http://marisstellacollege.lk/maris/

1922 establishments in Ceylon
Catholic schools in Sri Lanka
Educational institutions established in 1921
Marist Brothers schools
Private schools in Sri Lanka
Schools in Negombo